Ivan Nikolayevich Miroshnichenko (born 4 February 2004) is a Russian ice hockey forward who currently plays for Omskie Krylia of the Supreme Hockey League (VHL) as a prospect under contract with Avangard Omsk of the Kontinental Hockey League (KHL). Miroshnichenko was drafted 20th overall by the Washington Capitals in the 2022 NHL Entry Draft.

Playing career
Miroshnichenko played as a youth through the junior ranks within the HC Vityaz organization. On 27 December 2020, he moved from within Vityaz to fellow KHL club, Avangard Omsk.

During the 2021–22 season while in the VHL with affiliate, Omskie Krylia, on 28 February 2022, Miroshnichenko signed a contract extension with Avangard that will keep him playing in Russia until 2024. In March 2022, Miroshnichenko was diagnosed with Hodgkin lymphoma, which prematurely ended his season in the VHL. After receiving treatment in Germany, the cancer went into full remission. Three months after his diagnosis, Miroshnichenko resumed skating in preparation for the next season.

International play
Miroshnichenko scored six goals and eight points playing for Team Russia at the 2021 IIHF World U18 Championships, winning a silver medal. He was captain of Team Russia at the 2021 Hlinka Gretzky Cup, winning gold.

Career statistics

Regular season and playoffs

International

References

External links
 

2004 births
Russian ice hockey forwards
Living people
Ice hockey players at the 2020 Winter Youth Olympics
National Hockey League first-round draft picks
Washington Capitals draft picks
Youth Olympic gold medalists for Russia